Lisa Dowd is a British news reporter for Sky News. She joined Sky News in 2005, she used to be a reporter for Central Tonight West.

She began her career in Radio being a Reporter in Coventry for Kix96, Beacon radio in Wolverhampton and at HeartFM and DNN in Birmingham.

External links 
 Lisa Dowd's biography

British television presenters
English television presenters
Sky News newsreaders and journalists
British reporters and correspondents
English journalists
Living people
Year of birth missing (living people)
Place of birth missing (living people)